Anneke Kim Sarnau (born 1972) is a German theater and movie actress living in Berlin.

Life 
Anneke Kim Sarnau, who comes from Klein Offenseth-Sparrieshoop, graduated from the Bismarckschule in Elmshorn and then began studying philosophy and English at the University of Kiel.

Kim Sarnau has a son born in 2011 and a daughter born in 2014.

Filmography

Cinema films 
 2003: 
 2005: The Constant Gardener
 2005: Fremde Haut
 2006: 
 2008: Up! Up! To the Sky
 2009: Germany 09
 2012: Pommes essen
 2014: Honig im Kopf
 2015: 
 2015: 
 2016: Conni & Co
 2016: Blank
 2017: Simpel
 2017: Rock My Heart – Mein wildes Herz
 2019: Sweethearts
 2023: Bones and Names

TV films 
 2000: 
 2000: Bella Block: Am Ende der Lüge
 2000: Alarm für Cobra 11 – Die Autobahnpolizei: Schachmatt
 2001: 
 2001: Eine Hochzeit und (k)ein Todesfall
 2002: 
 2002: Mehr als nur Sex
 2002: Das Duo: Totes Erbe
 2002: Juls Freundin
 2003: Ich liebe das Leben
 2003: Sperling und die letzte Chance
 2004: Kommissarin Lucas: Vertrauen bis zuletzt
 2004: Tatort: Hundeleben
 2005: In Sachen Kaminski
 2005: Tatort: Am Abgrund
 2005: Im Namen des Gesetzes: Videobeweis
 2006: Rosa Roth: Der Tag wird kommen
 2006: Der falsche Tod
 2007: Prager Botschaft
 2007–2008: Dr. Psycho – Die Bösen, die Bullen, meine Frau und ich
 2007: Die andere Hälfte des Glücks
 2007: Mitte 30
 2008: Ihr könnt euch niemals sicher sein
 2009: Ein Mann, ein Fjord!
 2009: Die Drachen besiegen
 2010: 
 since 2010: Polizeiruf 110
 2010: Tatort: Die Heilige
 2010: Das Haus ihres Vaters
 2011: Uns trennt das Leben
 2013: Alles auf Schwarz – Wacken, Documentary about the Wacken Open Air
 2013: Weit hinter dem Horizont
 2014: Keine Zeit für Träume
 2015: Unter Verdacht: Ein Richter
 2015: Crossing Lines – Virus
 2016: Wellness für Paare
 2016: Shakespeares letzte Runde
 2017: Die Diva, Thailand und wir!
 2017: Götter in Weiß
 2017: Willkommen bei den Honeckers
 2017: Hit Mom – Mörderische Weihnachten
 2018: Endlich Witwer
 2019: Das Quartett: Der lange Schatten des Todes
 2019: Der Sommer nach dem Abitur
 2019: Käse und Blei

Short films 
 1996: Boy Meets Winona (director and script: Christian Bahlo)
 2005: Eine einfache Liebe (director and script: Maike Mia Höhne)
 2009: Schautag (director: Marvin Kren)
 2016: Das Beste am Norden (director and script: Detlev Buck, Clips)

Voice actor roles 
 2011: Polizeiruf 110 – Im Alter von … (voice from Sigrid Göhler)

Evolvements in theater 

 1997/1998: Alice im Wunderland, Stadttheater Klagenfurt
 1997: Vinny, Burgtheater Wien
 1997: Jugend ohne Gott, Burgtheater Wien
 1997: Katzelmacher, Burgtheater Wien
 1998: Kasimir und Karoline, Burgtheater Wien
 1998: Die heilige Johanna der Schlachthöfe, Burgtheater Wien
 1998: Die Riesen vom Berge, Burgtheater Wien
 1998: Schlacht um Wien, Burgtheater Wien
 1998: Ein Sportstück, Burgtheater Wien
 2003/2005: Der zerbrochne Krug, Düsseldorfer Schauspielhaus
 2004: Martha Jellnek, Hamburger Kammerspiele
 2005/2006: Ein spanisches Stück, Deutsches Schauspielhaus Hamburg

Audio books (selection) 

 2009: Tödliche Worte from Val McDermid. Random House Audio, ISBN 978-3-8371-0083-9
 2012: Liebe Lottofee, anbei meine Zahlen für kommende Woche from Jan Hofer, gesprochen von Sarnau, Jan Hofer und Oliver Kalkofe. Random House Audio, ISBN 978-3-625-16048-9
 2012: Tante Martha im Gepäck from Ulrike Herwig. Hörbuch Hamburg, ISBN 978-3-86909-103-7
 2013: Das Nebelhaus von Eric Berg, voice by Sarnau and Jürgen Uter. Jumbo Neue Medien & Verlag, ISBN 978-3-8337-3222-5
 2019: Lucy Fricke: Töchter (Betty) – director: Martin Zylka (NDR)

Awards 

 2002: Adolf-Grimme-Preis with Gold for her performance in Ende der Saison
 2002: Deutscher Fernsehpreis in the category „Beste Hauptdarstellerin“ ("Best Main Actor") for Ende der Saison and Die Hoffnung stirbt zuletzt
 2002: Goldener Gong for Die Hoffnung stirbt zuletzt
 2002: Special Award beim Fernsehfilmpreis der Deutschen Akademie der Darstellenden Künste for Die Hoffnung stirbt zuletzt
 2003: Adolf-Grimme-Preis for Die Hoffnung stirbt zuletzt
 2003: Bayerischer Fernsehpreis for Die Hoffnung stirbt zuletzt
 2003: Lilli-Palmer-Gedächtniskamera as best young actor
 2019: Drosteipreis, recognition award for Kulturschaffende

References

External links 

Anneke Kim Sarnau on IMDb
Anneke Kim Sarnau on filmportal.de
Literature from and about Anneke Kim Sarnau in the German National Library

1975 births
Living people
German film actresses
German stage actresses
Actresses from Berlin